Alto Astral  (International Title:Forever and Ever) is a Brazilian access prime telenovela produced and broadcast by TV Globo. It premiered on November 3, 2014, replacing Geração Brasil and ended on May 8, 2015 replaced by I Love Paraisópolis. It was originally created by Andréa Maltarolli, but due to her death in 2009, it's being written by Daniel Ortiz, with the supervision of Silvio de Abreu.

Plot 
Since childhood, Caíque (Sergio Guizé) drew the face of an unknown young woman. One day, thanks to the help of a mysterious spirit named Bella (Nathália Costa), Caíque comes face to face with Laura (Nathalia Dill), the girl he always drew. When she comes in front of him, he can hardly believe that the woman of his dreams exists. What they do not realize is that Laura is the bride of Marcos (Thiago Lacerda), Caíque's brother. Even engaged to Laura, Marcos maintains a secret relationship with Sueli (Débora Nascimento).

But the rivalry between the two brothers goes far beyond that. Heirs of a large hospital, both are doctors with opposite attitudes. Marcos is a successful surgeon who dreams to have all the hospital just for him, while Caíque is a general practitioner who gives diagnosis by phone and makes operations in adverse conditions, despite fear of blood. Caíque can see spirits and is followed by one spirit named Castilho (Marcelo Médici). The spirit appeared to him as a child, and now reappears putting the doctor in absurd and comical situations.

In the middle of the fight between the two brothers, is Laura (Nathalia Dill), a certain journalist. She lives with her grandfather Vicente (Otávio Augusto) and her siblings Gustavo (Guilherme Leicam) and Bia (Raquel Fabbri). While Bia is a responsible and hard-working girl, Gustavo is an arrogant and highly irresponsible kid. Not only does he criticise the lives of others, but he also opposes the romance between his sister and Caíque. He works with Marcos to separate them so that Marcos can marry Laura. In addition to working and raising a family, Laura tries to find her mother, who abandoned her when she was little. Four women are suspected to be the real mother of Laura, and the journalist investigates them one by one.

Strengthening the villainy is Samantha (Claudia Raia), a psychic charlatan. This exuberant, extravagant and quite glamorous woman was already quite famous thanks to her powers of clairvoyance. But as she used her premonitions to make money, she ended up losing her gift. She's the Ex-girlfriend of Caíque and still very passionate. She sees the doctor as her great opportunity to return to stardom and fame. For this she will spare no effort, nor scruples to hinder the doctor's romance with Laura. Samantha has as an accomplice, a Peruvian nurse called Pepito (Conrado Caputo) that helps in heir villainy.

Maria Inês (Christiane Torloni) is the adoptive mother of Marcos and Caíque. She is a very lonely woman, since she is a widow of Mr. Bittencourt. She married without loving her husband, for the great love of her life is Marcelo (Edson Celulari). Several years later they meet again in a library, and the love they both have for each other comes back. But this love will face a major obstacle: Marcelo is married to Úrsula (Silvia Pfeifer), a woman without scruples, who pretends to have a fatal disease just to keep her husband. Úrsula pretends to be the best friend of Maria Inês, but deep down hates her, knowing that her husband is in love with her.

Across the street is the World-Map Family, composed by the patriarch Manoel (Leopoldo Pacheco), the stepmother Tina (Elizabeth Savalla) and children Israel (Kayky Brito), Bélgica ("Belgium"; played by Giovanna Lancellotti), Itália ("Italy"; played by Sabrina Petraglia) and Afeganistão ("Afghanistan"; played by Gabriel Godoy). Manuel works in the cafeteria of the City Club, which belongs to Santana family. Manoel is the brother of Maria Inês, and does not accept any help that comes from the sister. Afeganistão also works in the cafeteria, a boy who only speaks wrong. Itália is a nurse working in the Bittencourt Hospital. At first she is dating César (Alejandro Claveaux), a playboy who dates her in order to win a bet. Then he begins to fall in love for real. Israel is a physician-surgeon, who had long ceased to perform his specialty in the hospital, thanks to Marcos' machinations. Bélgica is fake, pretending to be best friends with Gaby (Sophia Abrahão), but deep down dies of envy from her. Meanwhile, Tina divides a life between Nova Alvorada and São Paulo.

Cast 

Cameos

Curiosities 
 The title of the original synopsis was Muu, which would allude to a cow that would fall from the sky at the beginning of the plot, but because of changes, and the fact that there are ghosts in the story, the provisional name was Búu. As Búu had phonetic like another soap opera: O Rebu, Globo decided to change the name again. Other names being considered were: Assombrações, Plano Astral and Supernatural.
 Bruno Gagliasso and Débora Falabella were rated to be the protagonists, but given the refusal of the first, Falabella also dropped. Grazi Massafera came to be announced by the press as the protagonist, but denied the information. Paolla Oliveira was also listed for the protagonist post.
 Sergio Guizé was quoted to be the villain of the story. But was upgraded to be the protagonist, as Bruno Gagliasso gave up the role.
 To occupy the villain post that was still vacant, the Rede Globo chose Rodrigo Lombardi. As the actor was already in the air Meu Pedacinho de Chão, they decided that he shouldn't amend two consecutive jobs. The character was given to Thiago Lacerda.
 Monica Iozzi had been cast as the villain Samantha. But she lost the role to Claudia Raia. The ex CQC won another character in the plot.
 The first scenes were filmed in Poços de Caldas and Pedra Azul (Espírito Santo) as part of the fictional town of Nova Alvorada.

International Broadcasting

Awards and nominations

References

External links 

 
 

2014 telenovelas
TV Globo telenovelas
Brazilian telenovelas
2014 Brazilian television series debuts
2015 Brazilian television series endings
Brazilian LGBT-related television shows
Portuguese-language telenovelas
Telenovelas about spiritism